José Luis Campi (born January 27, 1971 in Colegiales, Buenos Aires, Argentina) is a former Argentine footballer who played for clubs of Argentina, Chile and Canada.

Teams
  Atlanta 1990–1995
  Gimnasia y Esgrima de Jujuy 1995–1998
  Cobreloa 1999
  Platense 2000
  Deportes Concepción 2001–2002
  Platense 2002
  Deportes Puerto Montt 2003
  Edmonton Aviators 2004
  Gimnasia y Esgrima de Jujuy 2005–2007
  Talleres de Perico 2007–2008
  Juventud Antoniana 2008–2010

References
 Profile at BDFA 
 Profile at En una Baldosa 
 Profile at Fútbol XXI  

1971 births
Living people
Argentine footballers
Argentine expatriate footballers
Club Atlético Platense footballers
Gimnasia y Esgrima de Jujuy footballers
Club Atlético Atlanta footballers
Cobreloa footballers
Puerto Montt footballers
Deportes Concepción (Chile) footballers
Expatriate footballers in Chile
Expatriate soccer players in Canada
Talleres de Perico footballers

Association footballers not categorized by position
Footballers from Buenos Aires